Soron Shukar Kshetra railway station is a small railway station in Kasganj district, Uttar Pradesh. Its code is SRNK. It serves Soron city. The station consists of two platforms. The platforms are not well sheltered. This railway station looks like a religious place. The station is designed like a temple. Two statues of God Varaha are placed at the main gate.

Passing Trains

References

Railway stations in Kasganj district
Izzatnagar railway division